Anna Maria Christmann (1697–1760), was a German soldier.  She served dressed as a man while a soldier under Prince Eugene of Savoy during the Ottoman–Venetian War (1714–1718) in 1715–1718. She became famous in her time and her story was published several times from 1833 onward.

References

Sources
 Helmut Engisch: Eine Jungfrau im Türkenkrieg: Wie die Anna Maria Christmann als württembergischer Grenadier das Abendland retten half und dann in Stuttgart Briefträgerin wurde. In: Helmut Engisch: Ein Mönch fliegt übers Schwabenland. Theiss, Stuttgart 1996, 

1697 births
1760 deaths
18th-century German people
18th-century German women
Women in 18th-century warfare
18th-century Austrian military personnel
Female wartime cross-dressers
People of the Ottoman–Venetian Wars